The 65th Annual Primetime Creative Arts Emmy Awards ceremony was held on September 15, 2013, at the Nokia Theatre in Downtown Los Angeles. The ceremony was held in conjunction with the annual Primetime Emmy Awards and is presented in recognition of technical and other similar achievements in American television programming, including guest acting roles. The ceremony was highlighted by 8 Emmy wins for the HBO film Behind the Candelabra, as well as Bob Newhart's win for a guest appearance on The Big Bang Theory, his first Emmy win in a TV career spanning over 5 decades. The ceremony was taped to air on Saturday, September 21, 2013, on FXX, one night before the live 65th Primetime Emmy Awards telecast on CBS.

Winners and nominees
Winners are listed first and highlighted in bold:

Governor's Award
 June Foray

Programs

Acting

Art Direction

Casting

Cinematography

Commercial

Costuming

Directing

Hairstyling

Hosting

Lighting Design / Direction

Main Title Design

Make-up

Music

Picture Editing

Sound

Special Visual Effects

Stunt Coordination

Technical Direction

Writing

Presenters

 Scott Bakula
 Mark Burnett
 Linda Cardellini
 Joelle Carter
 Mark Cuban
 Roma Downey
 Rupert Friend
 Pamela Fryman
 Gilbert Gottfried
 Nolan Gould
 Lori Greiner
 Tim Gunn
 Dan Harmon
 Neil Patrick Harris
 Robert Herjavec
 Jamie Hyneman
 Daymond John
 Heidi Klum
 Joel McHale
 Katharine McPhee
 Margo Martindale
 Rickey Minor
 Jon Murray
 Kevin O'Leary
 Chris Parnell
 Adam Savage
 Robert Smigel
 Yeardley Smith
 Cobie Smulders
 Triumph the Insult Comic Dog
 Matthew Weiner
 Jerry Weintraub
 McKenzie Westmore
 Graham Yost

References

External links
 Academy of Television Arts and Sciences website

065 Creative Arts
2013 in American television
2013 television awards
2013 in Los Angeles
2013 awards in the United States
September 2013 events in the United States